Tephrinops is a monotypic moth genus of the family Erebidae. Its only species, Tephrinops velutisigna, is found in the Brazilian state of Espírito Santo. Both the genus and species were first described by George Hampson in 1926.

References

Calpinae
Monotypic moth genera